The Villanova Wildcats baseball team is the varsity intercollegiate baseball program of Villanova University in Philadelphia, Pennsylvania, United States. The program's first season was in 1866, and it has been a member of the NCAA Division I Big East Conference since the start of the 1980 season. Its home venue is Villanova Ballpark at Plymouth, located on Villanova's campus. Kevin Mulvey is the team's head coach starting in the 2017 season. The program has appeared in 2 NCAA Tournaments at the Division I level.

History

Early history
The program's first season of play was 1866.

Villanova Ballpark at Plymouth

Prior to the venue's construction, Villanova played on campus at McGeehan Field until 1998 and at Richie Ashburn Field from 1999 to 2002. The stadium holds 750 spectators.

Head coaches
Villanova's longest tenured head coach was Art Mahan, who has coached the team for 23 years.

See also
 List of NCAA Division I baseball programs

References

External links